Sowia Góra  is a village in the administrative district of Gmina Międzychód, within Międzychód County, Greater Poland Voivodeship, in west-central Poland.

The village has a population of 20.

References

Villages in Międzychód County